Francis Bird (1667–1731) was one of the leading English sculptors of his time. He is mainly remembered for sculptures in Westminster Abbey and St Paul's Cathedral. He carved a tomb for the dramatist William Congreve in Westminster Abbey and sculptures of the apostles and evangelists on the exterior of St Paul's, a memorial to William Hewer in the interior of St Paul's Church, Clapham as well as the statue of Henry VI in School Yard, Eton College. Despite his success, later in life Bird did little sculpting. He had inherited money from his father-in-law and set up a marble import business.

Life
He was born in the St James's Parish in Westminster in what is now central London in 1667.

At about eleven years old he was sent to Flanders where he studied under the sculptors Jan and Henri Cosyns. He then went on his first trip to Rome to study further, under Le Gros. He returned to London around 1689. He had been so long abroad he found he could hardly speak English. In London he worked under Grinling Gibbons and Caius Gabriel Cibber. After a few years, he went back to Rome for a further nine months where he is documented as an assistant to Pierre Le Gros the Younger in 1697.

St Paul’s Cathedral, London
Bird is best known for his work at St Paul's Cathedral. In March 1706 he was paid £329 for the panel over the west door and in December of that year £650 for carving the "Conversion of St Paul", 64' long and 17' high for the great pediment. This contained "eight large figures” six whereof on horseback and several of them "two and a half feet imbost". In 1711 he carved the statue of Queen Anne with four other figures, which was erected in St Paul's Cathedral yard in 1712. This statue was saved from demolition in December 1886 when it was replaced by the present statue executed by Richard Belt. The original Queen Anne statue is now in St Leonards-on-Sea in the grounds of the former St Mary's School. For these he received a total sum of £2,040.

Other known works
Memorial to Hugh Darrell (1690) in West Wycombe
Memorial (with bust) to Thomas Shadwell (1692) in Westminster Abbey
Memorial to Richard Busby (1695) in Westminster Abbey
Memorial to Mrs Fitzherbert (1699) in Tissington
Memorial to the Duke of Bedford (1701) in Chenies
Memorial to Jane wife of Christopher Wren (1701) in St Paul's Cathedral
Statue of Henry VIII (1703) At St Bartholonew's Gate, Smithfield, London
Memorial to the Earl of Huntingdon (1704) in St James' Church in Piccadilly
Memorial to Sir Orlando Gee (1705) at Isleworth
Monument to Mrs Eyre (1705) in Salisbury Cathedral
Statue of Queen Anne (1706) at Kingston-upon-Thames
Memorial to Robert Killigrew (1707) in Westminster Abbey
Monument to Rev John Cawley (1709) at Henley-on-Thames
Monument to Mrs Benson (1710) in St Leonard's Church in Shoreditch
Memorial to the Duke of Newcastle (1711) in Westminster Abbey
Memorial to John Ernest Grabe (1711) in Westminster Abbey
Statue of Queen Anne (1712) at St Paul's Cathedral
Memorial to Admiral Henry Priestman (1712) in Westminster Abbey
Memorial to the Earl of Godolphin (1712) in Westminster Abbey
Memorial to Thomas Sprat, Bishop of Rochester (1713) in Westminster Abbey
Memorial to John Sharp, Archbishop of York (1714) in York Minster
Memorial to Anthony Wingfield (1714) at Stonham Aspal in Suffolk
Memorial to Admiral John Baker (1716) in Westminster Abbey
Statue of John Radcliffe (1717) at University College, Oxford
Statue of Henry VI (1719) at Eton College
Statue of Cardinal Wolsey (1719) at Christ Church, Oxford
Statue of Queen Mary (1720) at University College, Oxford
Statue of Lord Clarendon (1721) in the Clarendon Building in Oxford
Statuary group (1721) in the Clarendon Building in Oxford
Monument to the Cavendish family (1728) at Bolsover
Memorial to William Congreve (1729) in Westminster Abbey

Gallery

Notes

1667 births
1731 deaths
18th-century British sculptors
18th-century English male artists
English male sculptors
People educated at The Oratory School
Sculptors from London